The 1993 Hooters 500 was the 30th and final stock car race of the 1993 NASCAR Winston Cup Series season and the 34th iteration of the event. The race was held on Sunday, November 14, 1993, in Hampton, Georgia, at Atlanta Motor Speedway, a  permanent asphalt quad-oval intermediate speedway. The race took the scheduled 328 laps to complete. In the final laps of the race, Penske Racing South driver Rusty Wallace would make a late-race charge to take the lead with four laps to go, securing his 31st career NASCAR Winston Cup Series victory and his 10th and final victory of the season. To fill out the top three, Hendrick Motorsports driver Ricky Rudd and owner-driver Darrell Waltrip would finish second and third, respectively. 

Meanwhile, 10th-place finisher Dale Earnhardt would manage to win his sixth career NASCAR Winston Cup Series championship, only needing a 34th-place finish or better to do so. With the championship, he was one championship away from tying Richard Petty's record of seven championships.

Background 

Atlanta Motor Speedway (formerly Atlanta International Raceway) is a 1.522-mile race track in Hampton, Georgia, United States, 20 miles (32 km) south of Atlanta. It has annually hosted NASCAR Winston Cup Series stock car races since its inauguration in 1960.

The venue was bought by Speedway Motorsports in 1990. In 1994, 46 condominiums were built over the northeastern side of the track. In 1997, to standardize the track with Speedway Motorsports' other two intermediate ovals, the entire track was almost completely rebuilt. The project made the track one of the fastest on the NASCAR circuit.

Entry list 

 (R) - denotes rookie driver.

*Driver switched to Phil Parsons for the race after Bodine was involved in a crash that would injure him in the preliminary Saturday race.

Qualifying 
Qualifying was split into two rounds. The first round was held on Thursday, November 12, at 1:00 PM EST. Each driver would have one lap to set a time. During the first round, the top 20 drivers in the round would be guaranteed a starting spot in the race. If a driver was not able to guarantee a spot in the first round, they had the option to scrub their time from the first round and try and run a faster lap time in a second round qualifying run, held on Saturday, November 13, at 11:00 AM EST. As with the first round, each driver would have one lap to set a time. For this specific race, positions 21-40 would be decided on time, and depending on who needed it, a select amount of positions were given to cars who had not otherwise qualified but were high enough in owner's points; up to two were given.  If needed, a past champion who did not qualify on either time or provisionals could use a champion's provisional, adding one more spot to the field.

Ten drivers would fail to qualify.

Full qualifying results

Race results

Standings after the race 

Drivers' Championship standings

Note: Only the first 10 positions are included for the driver standings.

References 

1993 NASCAR Winston Cup Series
NASCAR races at Atlanta Motor Speedway
November 1993 sports events in the United States
1993 in sports in Georgia (U.S. state)